James Canada (January 9, 1912 – January 17, 1975) was an American Negro league first baseman in the 1930s and 1940s.

A native of Montgomery, Alabama, Canada made his Negro leagues debut in 1937 with the Birmingham Black Barons. He went on to play for the Atlanta Black Crackers and Jacksonville Red Caps, and finished his career with a three-year stint with the Memphis Red Sox from 1943 to 1945. Canada died in Bessemer, Alabama in 1975 at age 63.

References

External links
 and Seamheads

1912 births
1975 deaths
Atlanta Black Crackers players
Birmingham Black Barons players
Jacksonville Red Caps players
Memphis Red Sox players
Baseball first basemen
Baseball players from Montgomery, Alabama
20th-century African-American sportspeople